The 2013 NCAA Division I Outdoor Track and Field Championships were the 92nd NCAA Division I Men's Outdoor Track and Field Championships and the 32nd NCAA Division I Women's Outdoor Track and Field Championships at Hayward Field in Eugene, Oregon on the campus of the University of Oregon from  June 5–8, 2013. In total, thirty-six different men's and women's track and field events were contested.

On the men's side, the team national championship was shared between the Texas A&M Aggies, their fourth title, and the Florida Gators, their second consecutive title. On the women's side, the team national championship was won by the Kansas Jayhawks, their first title.

Results

Men's events

100 meters
Final results shown, not prelims
Wind: +3.2

200 meters
Final results shown, not prelims
Wind: +2.6

400 meters
Final results shown, not prelims

800 meters
Final results shown, not prelims

1500 meters
Only top eight final results shown; no prelims are listed

5000 meters
Held on June 8, 2013. Only top eight final results shown

10,000 meters
Held on June 6, 2013. Only top eight final results shown

3000 meter steeplechase
Held on June 7, 2013. Only top eight final results shown

Women's events

100 meters
Final results shown, not prelims
Wind: +0.9

200 meters
Final results shown, not prelims
Wind: +3.5

400 meters
Final results shown, not prelims

800 meters
Final results shown, not prelims

1500 meters
Only top eight final results shown; no prelims are listed

5000 meters
Held on June 8, 2013. Only top eight final results shown

10,000 meters
Held on June 5, 2013. Only top eight final results shown

3000 meter steeplechase
Held on June 8, 2013. Only top eight final results shown

See also
 NCAA Division I Men's Outdoor Track and Field Championships 
 NCAA Division I Women's Outdoor Track and Field Championships

References

NCAA Men's Outdoor Track and Field Championship
NCAA Division I Outdoor Track And Field Championships
NCAA Division I Outdoor Track And Field Championships
NCAA Women's Outdoor Track and Field Championship